Balmahmut is a village in the Sinanpaşa District, Afyonkarahisar Province, Turkey. Its population is 487 (2021).

References

Villages in Sinanpaşa District